Eduard Müller (born 31 August 1962) is an Austrian politician and author. He served as Minister of Finance in 2019. He also managed the Ministry of Civil Service and Sports.

Life 
Müller was born in Oberwart and attended elementary school in Rumpersdorf before attending Handelsakademie, a vocational high school for business and commerce. He graduated from Handelsakademie in 1981 and worked as a tax inspector in Oberwart until 1994. He began his studies at the University of Hagen with a major in economics. He received a Diplom-Kaufmann in 1994 and a Master of Business Administration in 2012.

In 1994 he moved to the Financial Directorate in Vienna and then to the Ministry of Finance in 1997. From 2001 to 2005 he was the leader of the project to reform the Ministry of Finance, and from 2002 to 2013 he led the Tax and Customs Administration in the Ministry of Finance. In November 2013 he became the managing director of Linde Publishing for whom he authored a number of specialist publications on tax law such as the SteuerSparBuch (Tax Savings Book) for those paying payroll tax or who are self-employed. He returned to the Ministry of Finance in October 2015 when then-Finance Minister Hans Jörg Schelling made him Section Chief. That same year he served as chair of the federal examination board for auditors and tax professionals as well as Deputy Secretary General of the Ministry of Finance.

Since 3 June 2019 Müller has been serving as Austria's minister of finance in the Bierlein government. He is also tasked with managing the Ministry of Civil Service and Sports.

Other activities

European Union organizations
 European Investment Bank (EIB), ex officio member of the board of governors (since 2019)
 European Stability Mechanism (ESM), member of the board of governors (since 2019)

International organizations
 Asian Development Bank (ADB), ex officio member of the board of governors (2019-2020)
 Asian Infrastructure Investment Bank (AIIB), ex officio member of the board of governors (2019-2020)
 Inter-American Investment Corporation (IIC), ex officio member of the board of governors (2019-2020)
 Joint World Bank–IMF Development Committee, chair (2019-2020)
 Multilateral Investment Guarantee Agency (MIGA), World Bank Group, ex officio member of the board of governors (2019-2020)
 World Bank, ex officio member of the board of governors (2019-2020)

Non-profit organizations
 National Fund of the Republic of Austria for Victims of National Socialism, ex officio member of the board of trustees

Personal life
His brother, Wilhelm Müller, is mayor of Weiden bei Rechnitz.

References 

1962 births
People from Burgenland
Austrian non-fiction writers
Finance Ministers of Austria
Living people
20th-century Austrian people
21st-century Austrian people
21st-century Austrian politicians